Guillermo Lorenzo Tolentino Eleazar (born November 13, 1965) is a Filipino retired police officer who previously served as Chief of the Philippine National Police. He previously served as Deputy Chief for Administration of the Philippine National Police before his appointment as PNP Chief in 2021. On May 5, 2021, DILG Secretary Eduardo Año announced his designation as the next Chief of the Philippine National Police. He was succeeded by Dionardo Carlos as PNP Chief on November 13, 2021.

Career
On January 31, 2000, Chief Inspector Eleazar received the award for Junior Police Commissioned Officer of the Year from the Philippine National Police when he was at the Police Regional Office 4 (PRO-4).

Politics
Eleazar ran for senator in the 2022 Philippine Senate elections as a Reporma candidate under the Lacson-Sotto senatorial ticket. He substituted the candidacy of radio commentator and PWD advocate Paolo Capino which was withdrew on November 12, 2021. His platform focused on improving the peace and order and security situation of the Philippines.

Personal life
Guillermo Eleazar was born on November 13, 1965 in Tagkawayan, Quezon. He is called "Guillor" or "Gemo" by his peers. Eleazar is married to Lally Hernandez, and they have four children together.

References

1965 births
Filipino police chiefs
Filipino Roman Catholics
Politicians from Quezon
Philippine Military Academy alumni
Living people
People of the Philippine Drug War
Partido para sa Demokratikong Reporma politicians